is a football stadium in the Nanakita Park, Izumi-ku, Sendai City, Miyagi Prefecture, Japan. Built in 1997, it is home to Vegalta Sendai, Mynavi Sendai Ladies and Sony Sendai. The stadium was specifically designed for football, and the stands are arranged close to the pitch. For games where the spectator capacity is insufficient, nearby Miyagi Stadium is occasionally used as a substitute.

History
The naming rights for the stadium were sold beginning on March 1, 2006 until February 28, 2009.

In 2009, the turf were replaced, and Vegalta played the first half of the season at Miyagi Stadium.

The stadium was damaged after the 2011 Tōhoku earthquake and tsunami.

It ranks among the top stadiums in Japan for its presence, comfort, and accessibility, and was once ranked second in an evaluation by a famous Japanese football media.

International matches

Football
Italy used the stadium as their base for training camp during the 2002 World Cup, and cast images of the team members footprints are on display outside the stadium.

The Sendai Cup (An international youth football tournament) has been held annually since 2003. Italy, France Brazil, and Croatia have participated, along with the hosts, Japan.

Exhibition matches between Vegalta Sendai and A.C. ChievoVerona and S.S. Lazio have been played at Sendai Stadium as well. The match with Chievo in 2003 was the final club game for Oliver Bierhoff.

Rugby
On June 16, 2007, the stadium was the venue for Japan vs. Samoa in the 2007 IRB Pacific Nations Cup. It was the first time an international rugby game had been played in the Tōhoku region.

On June 15, 2008, Japan defeated Tonga 35–13 at the stadium in the 2008 IRB Pacific Nations Cup.

Access
 Nanboku Line: 8 minutes walk from Izumi-Chūō Station.

See also 

 List of stadiums in Japan
 Miyagi Stadium

References

External links

 Pictures of Sendai Stadium (Much information on this site is out of date)
 WorldStadiums.com entry

Sports venues in Sendai
Football venues in Japan
Rugby union stadiums in Japan
Vegalta Sendai
American football venues in Japan
1997 establishments in Japan
Sports venues completed in 1997